Elizabeth D. Blanchard was a Democratic member of the New Hampshire House of Representatives, representing the Merrimack 10th District from 2002 to 2010.

External links
Project Vote Smart - Representative Elizabeth D. Blanchard (NH) profile
Follow the Money - Elizabeth Blanchard
2006 2004 2002 campaign contributions

Members of the New Hampshire House of Representatives
Living people
Women state legislators in New Hampshire
Year of birth missing (living people)
21st-century American women